Niki Bettendorf (20 December 1936 – 27 January 2018) was a Luxembourgish politician.  He served as Mayor of Bertrange from 1982 until 2001.

He was a member of the Chamber of Deputies for sixteen years, from 19 June 1990 until he resigned on 10 October 2006, when he resigned in favour of the younger Alex Krieps. During his tenure in the Chamber of Deputies, Bettendorf was one of the Chamber's three Vice Presidents (1999–2006), and also led Luxembourg's delegation to the NATO Parliamentary Assembly.

Footnotes

Mayors of Bertrange
Members of the Chamber of Deputies (Luxembourg)
Members of the Chamber of Deputies (Luxembourg) from Centre
Democratic Party (Luxembourg) politicians
1936 births
2018 deaths
People from Sanem